Arben Nuhiu (born 27 February 1972) is an association footballer from North Macedonia, who finished his club career with Vardar. He is an ethnic Albanian.

International career
He made his senior debut for Macedonia in a June 2000 friendly match against South Korea and has earned a total of 5 caps, scoring 2 goals. His final international was a November 2005 friendly against Liechtenstein.

References

External links

1972 births
Living people
Footballers from Skopje
Albanian footballers from North Macedonia
Association football forwards
Macedonian footballers
North Macedonia international footballers
KF Shkëndija players
FK Sloga Jugomagnat players
HNK Hajduk Split players
K.S.K. Beveren players
Yimpaş Yozgatspor footballers
FK Vardar players
Besa Kavajë players
KF Elbasani players
Macedonian Second Football League players
Macedonian First Football League players
Croatian Football League players
Belgian Pro League players
Süper Lig players
Kategoria Superiore players
Macedonian expatriate footballers
Expatriate footballers in Croatia
Macedonian expatriate sportspeople in Croatia
Expatriate footballers in Belgium
Macedonian expatriate sportspeople in Belgium
Expatriate footballers in Turkey
Macedonian expatriate sportspeople in Turkey
Expatriate footballers in Albania
Macedonian expatriate sportspeople in Albania